Lobotomizer is the debut album by Norwegian band Motorpsycho, released in 1991. The album has a raw sound and style (mostly heavy metal and grunge). However, it has been called the band's weakest record. The album includes the live-performance crowd-favourite "Hogwash". The title track and  the song "Eternity" show a less aggressive side of the band's sound.

Track listing
"Lobotomizer" – 1:02
"Grinder" – 3:48
"Hogwash" – 8:19
"Home of the Brave" – 6:42
Frances" – 3:39
"Wasted" – 3:58
"Eternity" – 2:08
"TFC" – 11:52
 Nr. 3, 4, 5, 6, 8 by Sæther.
 Nr. 1 by Sæther/Ryan.
 Nr. 2 by Sæther/Ryan/Jensen.
 Nr. 7 by Sæther/Ryan/Blake.
 Vinyl edition track list: Side A: #1–#4, Side B: #5–#8.

Personnel
Bent Sæther: vocals, bass, violin, guitars, percussion
Hans Magnus Ryan: guitars, back. vocals
Kjell Runar "Killer" Jensen: drums

with:
Geir Nilsen: hammond organ on "Hogwash"

References 

1991 debut albums
Motorpsycho albums